Strynø is a small Danish island lying west of Langeland, north-east of Ærø, and south of Tåsinge in the South Funen Archipelago. A constituent part of Langeland municipality, Strynø covers an area of 4.88 km2.

The population of the island on 1 January 2019 was 188.

Strynø hosts one shop, an inn, a kindergarten, a school (ages 5–10), and Øhavets Smakkecenter: a small maritime museum and activities centre.

A ferry service of around eight 30-minute crossings per day connects Strynø with Rudkøbing on Langeland.

Notable people 
 Hans Egede Saabye (1746 on Strynø – 1817) a Danish priest and a missionary to Greenland where he became an accomplished botanist.

References

External links
Velkommen til Strynø (in Danish)
Øhavets Smakkecenter
Welcome to the South Funen Archipelago
Ferry timetable

Islands of Denmark
Geography of Langeland Municipality